Olga Georges-Picot (6 January 1940 – 19 June 1997) was a French actress. She was a great-niece of François Georges-Picot.

Early life
Born in Shanghai, in Japanese-occupied China, she was the daughter of Guillaume Georges-Picot, the French Ambassador to China, and a Russian mother, Anastasia Mironovich. She attended the International School in Geneva in the early fifties with her sister. She also attended the Lycée français de New York (Class of 1958). She studied acting at the Actors Studio in Paris.

Career
Her acting career included roles in French and English films, and on television. She was featured in Playboy Magazine’s "Sex in Cinema" column, and also on the front cover of the periodical Adam.

She appeared in three mainstream films: Denise, the OAS mole, in The Day of the Jackal (1973); Countess Alexandrovna in Woody Allen’s Love and Death (1975); and Julie Anderson in Basil Dearden’s The Man Who Haunted Himself (1970). Her break-through role in the movies was as Catrine in the Alain Resnais’s film Je t'aime, je t'aime (1968). Earlier that year, she had appeared in the French television movie Thibaud the Crusader (1968).

Death
On Thursday 19 June 1997, she jumped to her death from the 5th floor of an apartment building in Paris, France.

Filmography

References

External links
 
 
Report

1940 births
1997 deaths
Suicides by jumping in France
French film actresses
French people of Russian descent
20th-century French actresses
French television actresses
Actresses from Shanghai
Lycée Français de New York alumni
1997 suicides